Symmachus ben Joseph ( Romanized: Sômǝkôs ben Joseph) was a Jewish Tanna sage of the fifth generation.

Biography
Rabbi Meir is considered his main teacher. After R. Meir died, and despite R. Judah ben Ilai's reluctance to teach R. Meir's students (who were considered "vexatious" students), Symmachus joined R. Judah ben Ilai's class and debated halakhic matters with him.

Symmachus' brilliance was described as follows:

Teachings
He is quoted five times in the Mishna: three times his teachings appear, and twice he quotes an opinion of Rabbi Meir.

He is best known for the following disagreement about judgment in a case of monetary dispute:

Later opinions differ on which situations Symmachus intended for his rule to apply.

Relation to other individuals named Symmachus
Some have tried to identify him with Symmachus the translator, but this view has been generally rejected. In Epiphanius' treatise On Weights and Measures, a certain Symmachus is said to have converted to Judaism from the Samaritan religion at the time of the Roman Emperor Marcus Aurelius who is also called Verus. Rabbi Meir would have been his contemporary.

References

Mishnah rabbis